Daniel Ray Kilgore (born December 18, 1987) is a former American football center. He was drafted by the San Francisco 49ers in the fifth round of the 2011 NFL Draft. He played college football at Appalachian State and attended Dobyns-Bennett High School in Kingsport, Tennessee.

Professional career

San Francisco 49ers

Kilgore was drafted by the 49ers in the fifth round, 163rd overall, in the 2011 NFL Draft.

At the end of the 2012 season, Kilgore and the 49ers appeared in Super Bowl XLVII. In the game, he contributed on special teams, but the 49ers fell to the Baltimore Ravens by a score of 34–31.

On February 27, 2014, the 49ers signed Kilgore to a contract extension that kept him on the roster through 2017.

Kilgore was placed on injured reserve on December 13, 2016.

On February 14, 2018, the 49ers signed Kilgore to a three-year contract extension for $12 million with $7 million guaranteed, keeping him under contract through the 2020 season.

Miami Dolphins
On March 15, 2018, the 49ers traded Kilgore and their seventh-round pick in the 2018 NFL Draft, number 227 overall, to the Miami Dolphins for a seventh-round pick, number 223 overall. The move was precipitated by the 49ers' signing of free agent center Weston Richburg the day before. He started the first four games at center before suffering a torn triceps in Week 4. He was placed on injured reserve on October 2, 2018.

On March 12, 2020, the Dolphins declined the option on Kilgore's contract, making him an unrestricted free agent.

Kansas City Chiefs
On August 27, 2020, Kilgore signed with the Kansas City Chiefs. He was placed on the reserve/COVID-19 list by the team on February 1, 2021. On February 6, 2021, Kilgore was activated off the reserve/COVID-19 list.

Kilgore announced his retirement on July 25, 2021.

References

External links
Kansas City Chiefs
Appalachian State Mountaineers football bio 

1987 births
Living people
Players of American football from Tennessee
People from Kingsport, Tennessee
American football offensive guards
American football centers
Appalachian State Mountaineers football players
San Francisco 49ers players
Miami Dolphins players
Kansas City Chiefs players